Eric John Meier (born 14 October 1946) is a former Australian politician who had been the sitting Liberal member for the electoral district of Goyder from 1982 until his retirement in 2006.

The 2006 election saw his successor, Steven Griffiths elected with a reduced margin of 9.1%.

References

 

Members of the South Australian House of Assembly
Liberal Party of Australia members of the Parliament of South Australia
1946 births
Living people
21st-century Australian politicians